Sofia Nami Samavati (born 14 February 2000) is a Danish tennis player.

Samavati has a career-high singles ranking by the Women's Tennis Association (WTA) of 313, achieved on 22 August 2022. She has won three singles titles on the ITF Women's Circuit. 

Competing for Denmark in the Billie Jean King Cup, Samavati has a win-loss record of 4–4.

ITF Circuit finals

Singles: 6 (3 titles, 3 runner-ups)

Notes

References

External links
 
 
 

2000 births
Living people
Danish female tennis players